Adrian Martin Newey,  (born 26 December 1958) is a British Formula One engineer. He is the chief technical officer of the Red Bull Racing F1 team. Newey has worked in both Formula One and IndyCar racing as a race engineer, aerodynamicist, designer and technical director and enjoyed success in both categories.

Considered one of the best engineers in Formula One, Newey's designs have won numerous titles and 195 Grands Prix. Newey is one of the most successful designers, winning eleven Constructors' Championships with three different Formula One teams, and with seven different drivers winning the Drivers' Championship driving Newey's designs. After designing championship-winning Formula One cars for Williams F1 and McLaren, Newey moved to Red Bull Racing in 2006, his cars winning the Formula One drivers' and constructors' championships consecutively from 2010 to 2013 plus 2022, and the drivers' championship in 2021 and 2022. Newey's designs also won the 1985 and 1986 CART titles.

Early life and career 
He was born in Stratford-upon-Avon, England on 26 December 1958 to Richard and Edwina Newey. His father was a veterinarian and his mother was an ambulance driver during the Second World War. He attended Repton public school alongside Jeremy Clarkson. Newey was asked to leave Repton at the age of 16 after an incident at a Greenslade concert at Repton's 19th-century Pears School Building organised by the school's sixth formers, where he pushed up the sound levels on the band's mixer, cracking the building's stained glass windows. Newey gained a first class honours degree in Aeronautics and Astronautics from the University of Southampton in 1980. Immediately after graduation he began working in motorsport for the Fittipaldi Formula One team under Harvey Postlethwaite. In 1981, he joined the March team. After a period as a race engineer for Johnny Cecotto in European Formula 2 Newey began designing racing cars. His first project, the March GTP sports car, was a highly successful design and won the IMSA GTP title two years running.

CART career 

In 1984, Newey moved to the March Indy car project, working as designer and race engineer for Bobby Rahal at Truesports. Newey formed a close friendship with Rahal, which would impact their careers some fifteen years later. Newey's March 85C design won the 1985 CART championship in the hands of Al Unser, and the 1985 Indianapolis 500 with Danny Sullivan. In 1986 Newey moved to Kraco to engineer Michael Andretti's car, while his March 86C design won the CART title and 1986 Indianapolis 500 with Bobby Rahal.

At the end of 1986 Newey joined the Haas Lola F1 team in an effort to improve its fortunes, but the team withdrew at the conclusion of the 1986 season. After a spell at Newman-Haas in 1987 working as Mario Andretti's race engineer, Newey was re-hired by March, this time to work in Formula One as chief designer.

Formula One career

March/Leyton House (1988–1990) 
Newey's first F1 design, the  March 881, was far more competitive than many expected, with Ivan Capelli finishing second in Portugal, and even passing Alain Prost's McLaren-Honda turbo for the lead of the Japanese Grand Prix briefly on lap 16.

In France Capelli finished second after a late pass by Prost's Ferrari, but that proved to be the year's bright spot, with the team's results declining. In the summer of 1990, Newey was fired, although he soon found another role. Newey later said: "I was fired but I'd already made up my mind I was going – because once a team gets run by an accountant, it's time to move. Your self-confidence does suffer but Williams had approached me."

Williams (1991–1996) 

Through the 1980s and into the 1990s, Williams F1 was a top running team, and technical director Patrick Head wasted no time in getting a contract signed. With a vastly superior budget, drivers and resources at his disposal, Newey and Head rapidly became the dominant design partnership of the early 1990s. By mid-season 1991, Newey's FW14 chassis was every bit a match for the previously dominant McLaren, but early season reliability issues and the efforts of Ayrton Senna prevented Williams team leader Nigel Mansell from taking the title.

In 1992, there would be no problems, and with dominance of the sport not repeated until the Ferrari/Schumacher era, Mansell took the drivers' crown and Newey secured his first constructors' title. 1993 delivered a second, this time with Alain Prost at the wheel of the FW15C.

1994 saw a rare dip in performance for Newey-designed cars and the team and drivers struggled to match the Rory Byrne-designed Benetton B194 for pace and reliability. Disaster struck at the 1994 San Marino Grand Prix with the death of Ayrton Senna who had joined Williams that year. A late-season charge, helped by a two-race ban for Schumacher, enabled Williams to claim their third straight constructors' championship. However, Williams were unable to take a third consecutive drivers' title, and with possible manslaughter charges for Senna's accident in prospect, cracks began to show in Newey's relationship with Williams team management.

By 1995, it was clear that Newey was once more ready to become technical director of a team, but with Head a share-holding founder of Williams he found his way blocked. Loss of both drivers' and constructors' titles to Benetton in 1995 saw further distance put between Newey and Williams, and by the time Damon Hill and Jacques Villeneuve secured both titles in 1996 Newey had been placed on gardening leave prior to joining McLaren.

His career at Williams ended with his cars winning 59 race victories, 78 pole positions and 60 fastest laps all from 114 races from 1991 till 1997. These seven years saw four drivers clinch world championship titles.

McLaren (1997–2005) 

Unable to influence the design of the 1997 McLaren, Newey was forced to attempt to improve on the Neil Oatley design while concentrating his efforts on the 1998 car. A win at the 1997 European Grand Prix saw McLaren enter the off-season on a high, and when the racing resumed four months later the McLaren MP4/13 was the car to beat. Titles followed in 1998 and 1999, and Mika Häkkinen narrowly missed out on a third drivers' title in 2000.

In the spring of 2001, Newey signed a contract with the Jaguar F1 team managed by Newey's friend and former CART colleague Bobby Rahal. Despite having a signed contract, Rahal was unable to complete the deal when McLaren boss Ron Dennis persuaded Newey to stay. Newey and Rahal later stated that the deal failed due to Rahal's position within Jaguar being undermined by Niki Lauda and internal politics at Ford. Rahal was fired from the team several months later.

Despite remaining with McLaren, rumours persisted that Newey wanted to leave the team, and by late 2004 his future began to look uncertain when speculation began that the engineer could return to Williams or even leave the sport completely. Despite strenuous denials from Ron Dennis stories continued to circulate during the 2004/2005 off-season that Newey's departure was imminent. In April 2005, it was confirmed that his contract with the team had been extended by six months to the end of the year at which point he was expected to take a sabbatical or retire from Formula One design completely, but on 19 July instead he stated that "this step can wait" and he would remain with McLaren for the year 2006.

Red Bull (2006–present) 

Despite those assurances, Red Bull Racing announced on 8 November 2005 that Newey would join the team from February 2006. The Guardian reported that Newey would be getting around $10 million a year at Red Bull Racing after McLaren baulked at increasing his salary in contract renewal negotiations.

Newey could hardly influence the design of the 2006 car and Red Bull's season started with poor results, having scored only two points from six races. However, the team's lead driver, David Coulthard, who had driven Newey-designed cars for years for both Williams and McLaren, managed to secure third place and six points in the Monaco Grand Prix. Although assisted by retirements of other competitors, indications were that the team was eventually beginning to pick up where it left off in 2005 when they finished a close seventh overall. The 2007 Red Bull of his design was powered by the Renault RS26 engine as the Ferrari 056 contract was transferred to Scuderia Toro Rosso, Red Bull Racing's "B team". The car was reasonably fast but rather unreliable, with each driver retiring seven times in a season of 17 races. Nevertheless, with the disqualification of McLaren-Mercedes, Red Bull achieved fifth place in the 2007 Constructors' Championship as targeted.
Technical directors Adrian Newey and Geoff Willis noted that the 2008 chassis was the most intricate design to have rolled out of their factory. The season started well for the team, with Mark Webber scoring five consecutive points finishes and Coulthard claiming a podium at Montreal. At the half-way mark, Red Bull was in a fierce battle for fourth place in the Constructors Championship, along with Renault and Toyota. However, Red Bull scored just five points in the second half of the season (compared to 24 in the first half) as the team slipped down the grid. Even Toro Rosso managed to outscore them by the end of the season.

The car Newey designed for 2009 represented a large step up in performance for the team, with one–two finishes at Shanghai, in a rain affected race, and at the British Grand Prix, both won by Sebastian Vettel. Webber went on to win in Germany before a hat-trick of wins for the team at the end of the season, including another one–two in Abu Dhabi. Red Bull finished the season a comfortable second in the Constructors' Championship.

The 2010 Red Bull car (the RB6) started the season well and proved to be the class of the field, winning on circuits requiring strengths in widely differing areas and winning the Constructors' Championship. It took 15 out of a possible 19 pole positions. At the 2010 Brazilian GP, Red Bull won the 2010 Constructors' Championship. On 14 November 2010 when Red Bull won the World Drivers' Championship with Sebastian Vettel, Newey became the only F1 designer to have won Constructors' Championships with three different F1 teams.

The 2011 RB7 built on the RB6's speed and also proved to be reliable, making it the clearly dominant car in the pack. The car took 18 of the 19 pole positions and won 12 races. On 9 October 2011, Red Bull won the World Drivers' Championship, making Sebastian Vettel the youngest double champion in the history of F1. Red Bull followed up this title with securing the Constructors' Championship on 16 October at the 2011 Korean Grand Prix.

The following year, despite initial concerns as to the car's superiority compared to the McLaren MP4-27 and a stern challenge from Ferrari's Fernando Alonso, Red Bull and Sebastian Vettel once again claimed the championship at a dramatic 2012 Brazilian Grand Prix.

In 2013, the RB9 along with Sebastian Vettel dominated the field after the summer break to defend both the World Drivers' and World Constructors' Championship in style at the 2013 Indian Grand Prix with Vettel scoring a record-breaking 9 consecutive wins from the Belgian Grand Prix till the season-ending Brazilian Grand Prix.

On 8 June 2014, Red Bull Racing announced that Newey has extended his contract for the next few seasons giving Newey a wider responsibility including "new Red Bull Technology projects". Allegedly, Red Bull fought off a £20m contract offer by Scuderia Ferrari.

In the current V6 engine era, his cars had been held back by the performance of the Renault and Honda power units, however all of them except the RB11 (2015) won at least two Grands Prix, with the RB10, RB12 and RB16 taking second place in the 2014, 2016, 2020 and 2021 Constructors' Championships. However his RB16B design was able to win the Drivers' Championship in 2021. In 2022 the Red Bull RB18 proved to be a strong contender and gave driver Max Verstappen his second World Drivers' Championship at the 2022 Japanese Grand Prix, as well as delivering the Red Bull team the 2022 Constructors' Championship.

Death of Ayrton Senna 

Following the death of Ayrton Senna at the 1994 San Marino Grand Prix in a car that Newey helped to design, Newey was among several members of the Williams team to be charged with manslaughter. In an initial ruling, in December 1997, Newey was acquitted. The acquittal was upheld on appeal in November 1999. In January 2003, the Italian Supreme Court re-opened the case, citing "material errors", the court gave Newey a full acquittal in May 2005.

Personal motorsports activities 

Newey is an avid sports car collector and driver, having participated in the Le Mans Legend races for a few years. He destroyed a Ford GT40 while competing in 2006, but escaped with only a cut finger. He later wrecked a Jaguar E-Type at the Goodwood Revival Meeting.

In 2007, he made the move to modern racing, becoming part of the driver line-up in the AF Corse Ferrari F430 for the 24 Hours of Le Mans. Newey and co-drivers Ben Aucott and Joe Macari managed to finish 22nd outright, and fourth in class.

On 15 June 2010, during the Sony E3 Electronic Entertainment Expo press conference, it was revealed that Newey collaborated as the chief technical officer for the video game Gran Turismo 5 for the PlayStation 3. A game trailer showed Newey along with race car driver Sebastian Vettel at the Red Bull Technology building in Great Britain in discussion with Kazunori Yamauchi, a Japanese game designer who is the CEO of Polyphony Digital and creator and producer of the Gran Turismo series. The three's collaboration would later lead to the completion of concept cars Red Bull X2010 and Red Bull X2011, which appeared in that game.

On 2 July 2010, Newey was rewarded with his own Red Bull RB5, out of regard for his achievements with Red Bull Racing since he joined the team in 2007. Newey first drove the car up the hill at the 2010 Goodwood Festival of Speed.

On 8 August 2010, Newey was involved in an accident whilst taking part in the Ginetta G50 Cup at the Snetterton circuit as a guest driver. He was spun into the path of Tony Hughes, and his car sustained a heavy side-on impact. He was taken to hospital for precautionary checks, but sustained no serious injuries.

Newey was appointed Officer of the Order of the British Empire (OBE) in the 2012 New Year Honours for services to motorsport.

On 10 October 2018, Newey was announced as an advisory board member of the forthcoming W Series, a racing championship for women based on Formula 3-homologated Tatuus T-318 chassis.

Family 
Newey's first wife was Amanda, a nurse, and they had two daughters Charlotte and Hannah. They married in 1983 and separated in 1989. He married his second wife Marigold in 1992 and they separated in 2010. They had a daughter Imogen and son Harrison. Newey has been married to Amanda "Mandy" Smerczak since August 2017. She is the daughter of South African actor Ron Smerczak.

His son Harrison is a racing driver, competing in his first full season of motor racing in 2015, finishing as runner-up in the BRDC Formula 4 Championship and also racing in German Formula 4. He went on to race in the MRF Challenge over the winter before stepping up to the European Formula 3 Championship for 2016. In the 2019 season he drives in the Super Formula Championship in Japan. He also drove in the 2019 British GT Championship in a Multimatic Motorsports Ford Mustang GT4 in the fifth race at Silverstone. He finished 27th overall and 15th in GT4.

Newey's memoir, How to Build a Car, was published in November 2017.

Formula One Championships 
Newey-designed cars have won eleven World Constructors' and twelve World Drivers' championships.

24 Hours of Le Mans results

References

External links 

 Adrian Newey's Red Bull Racing Profile
 Profile at grandprix.com

1958 births
Living people
Formula One designers
Red Bull Racing
McLaren people
Aerodynamicists
People from Stratford-upon-Avon
Alumni of the University of Southampton
English racing drivers
24 Hours of Le Mans drivers
English motorsport people
Officers of the Order of the British Empire
Segrave Trophy recipients
People educated at Repton School
English memoirists
Ginetta GT4 Supercup drivers
Williams Grand Prix Engineering
Lamborghini Super Trofeo drivers